Dean Phillip Carter (born  August 30, 1955) is a convicted spree killer currently housed on San Quentin, California's Death row. He has been convicted of the murder of four women: Susan Knoll, Jillette Mills, Bonnie Guthrie, and Janette Cullins. He was also implicated in the death of Tok Chum Kim. On March 25, 1984 Carter raped a woman who survived his attack.

See also 
 List of death row inmates in the United States

References 

1955 births
20th-century American criminals
Alaska Native people
American people convicted of murder
American people of Inuit descent
American prisoners sentenced to death
American rapists
American spree killers
Criminals from Alaska
Living people
People convicted of murder by California
People from Anchorage, Alaska
People from Fairbanks, Alaska
People from Nome, Alaska
Prisoners and detainees of Alaska
Prisoners and detainees of Oregon
Prisoners sentenced to death by California